Cicindela africana is a species of tiger beetle in the genus Cicindela.

References

africana
Beetles described in 1983